Colliers Green is a village near Cranbrook in Kent, England. 
Colliers Green School, a Church of England primary school, is located at the centre of the village.

References

External links

Villages in Kent